The Movement for Democracy and Aliyah  (HaTnu'a LeDemokratia VeAliya), commonly known as Da (lit. Yes), was a minor Israeli political party founded by immigrants from the former Soviet Union in the early 1990s.

History
The party was established in 1992 and sought to have the well-known refusenik Natan Sharansky head its list. After several changes of heart, Sharansky turned the offer down.

Led by Yuli Kosharovsky, in the elections that year the party won 11,697 votes (0.4% of the total, and around 5% of the immigrant vote), and failed to cross the electoral threshold of 1.5%. Most Russian immigrants voted for the Israeli Labor Party.

Notable members included Gennady Riger, who later served as general secretary and a MK for Yisrael BaAliyah, another immigrant party.

References

Political parties established in 1992
Defunct political parties in Israel
Russian-Jewish culture in Israel